The Greyface Dartmoor is a rare breed of domestic sheep originating around Dartmoor in south west England. Also known as the "Improved Dartmoor", this is a large and long-woolled breed, known for its distinctive facial markings. Its fleece can weigh  (more when from rams), and today the breed is primarily raised for meat.

References

External links

 Greyface Dartmoor Breeders Association (original web site) 
 Greyface Dartmoor Breeders Association
 Greyface Dartmoor, Sheep 101

Sheep breeds originating in England
Sheep breeds
Animal breeds on the RBST Watchlist